The Presidential Forum on Renewable Energy was created to ensure that renewable energy, sustainability, and conservation were top issues in the 2008 presidential election.  It brought together 2008 presidential candidates to generate discussion and foster innovation.

Presidential candidate forum

The Presidential Forum on Renewable Energy sponsored a presidential candidate forum on the afternoon of Saturday, November 17, 2007 at the Wadsworth Theatre in Los Angeles.  Hillary Clinton and John Edwards confirmed their participation, and we continue to work on lining up additional candidates to round out the event.

The Presidential Forum on Renewable Energy joined forces with leading environmental organizations to hold a single joint forum on global warming and renewable energy.  Their partner organizations in hosting the event included the Natural Resources Defense Council, the League of Conservation Voters, and the Center for American Progress.

Nationwide student essay contest

The Presidential Forum on Renewable Energy also sponsored a nationwide college student essay contest asking students to submit a Renewable Energy Plan for America. By engaging students, they encouraged them to incorporate an awareness of energy conservation into their everyday lives. A professional grading company along with board members of the Presidential Forum on Renewable Energy evaluated the essays and chose three first place winners.  The Presidential Forum on Renewable Energy awarded a $10,000 educational prize to each of these three renewable energy scholars.

External links
 Presidential Forum on Renewable Energy

Renewable energy in the United States
2008 United States presidential debates